The gens Articuleia was a Roman family who achieved prominence during the early Roman Empire. The gens is known chiefly from its two members who held the consulate.
Quintus Articuleius Paetus, suffect consul in AD 78 and ordinary consul in 101.
Quintus Articuleius Paetinus, ordinary consul in 123.

See also
 List of Roman gentes

References

Roman gentes